Do You Wanna Go Party is the sixth studio album by the funk and disco group KC and the Sunshine Band. The album was produced by Harry Wayne Casey and Richard Finch and was released in June 1979 on the TK label.

History
Do You Wanna Go Party contains the group's last number one hit in the US, "Please Don't Go". The title track was a moderate hit, with more success on the R&B chart, reaching the top ten.  The B-side to "Please Don't Go", "I Betcha Didn't Know That", was also a Top 20 R&B chart hit.

Track listing

Personnel
Harry Wayne Casey – keyboards, vocal
Jerome Smith – guitar
Richard Finch – bass guitar, drum, percussion
Robert Johnson – drum
Fermin Goytisolo – percussion
Ken Faulk – trumpet
Vinnie Tanno – trumpet
Jerry Peel – french horn
Joe Singer – french horn
Mike Lewis – tenor saxophone
Whit Sidener – baritone saxophone
Beverly Champion – background vocals
Donna Rhodes – background vocals
Althea Tate – background vocals

Guest musicians
Manuel Capote – strings
David Chappell – strings
Bogdan Chruszcz – strings
David Everhart – strings
Marguerit Haldeman – strings
Roslind Lang – strings
Marjorie Lash – strings
Stuart McDonald – strings
Susan Oltman – strings
Robert Phillips – strings
Debra Spring – strings
Guy Weddle – strings
Valerie Vonpechy – harp
Charles Chalmers – background vocals
Sandra Chalmers – background vocals
Teri DeSario – background vocals

References

External links
 Do You Wanna Go Party at Discogs

1979 albums
KC and the Sunshine Band albums
TK Records albums